Jerry Hill (born October 12, 1939) is a former professional American football running back for the National Football League's Baltimore Colts. He is a native of Lingle, Wyoming.

University of Wyoming
Born and raised in southeastern Wyoming, Hill played college football at the University of Wyoming in Laramie under head coach Bob Devaney. He was an All-Skyline Conference running back in 1959 and 1960, and was part of the 1958 team that won the Sun Bowl in his sophomore season.

Hill was selected as Wyoming football's Player of the 20th Century in 1992. He finished his collegiate career with 1,374 rushing yards on 288 carries. He was named as an 
Honorable Mention All-American in 1959 and 1960.

Baltimore Colts
Selected in the third round (35th overall) of the 1961 NFL Draft by the Baltimore Colts he played with them through 1970, including Super Bowls III and V.  Hill was primarily used as a blocking back for other rushers such as Lenny Moore and Tom Matte and protecting John Unitas from blitzing linebackers.  Hill's best season was in 1965 when he led the team in rushing with 516 yards.

National Brewing Company introduced Colt 45 malt liquor in 1963. Listed on the Pabst (the current owners of the beverage) website as a "Fun Fact," Colt 45 was named after running back #45 Jerry Hill of the 1963 Baltimore Colts and not the .45 caliber handgun ammunition round.

Awards and honors
All Skyline Conference Running Back (1959, 1960)
Inducted into Wyoming Cowboys Hall of Fame, October 29, 1993.
Member of 1958 Sun Bowl Champions
Member of 1968 NFL Champions
Member of Super Bowl V Champions
Wyoming Football Player of the 20th Century
Namesake of the Colt 45 malt liquor

References

External links
University of Wyoming Athletics Hall of Fame – Jerry Hill

1939 births
Living people
People from Torrington, Wyoming
People from Lingle, Wyoming
Players of American football from Wyoming
American football running backs
Wyoming Cowboys football players
Baltimore Colts players